Roda JC Vrouwen was the women's football section of Roda JC football club from Kerkrade, Netherlands. They wanted to join the Women's Eredivisie the year it was erected but did not get permission by the KNVB. On 1 March 2008 Roda JC announced that the next season they shall join the 2008-09 season.

In May 2009 Roda JC announced they withdraw the support for their women's section, for financial reasons.

Roda JC worked together with RKTSV from Kerkrade.

Results Eredivisie

2010-11 squad

Source: nl.women.soccerway.com& Roda JC fans.nl

Head coaches 
  René Eijer (2008–2009)

References

Roda JC Kerkrade
Women's football clubs in the Netherlands
Eredivisie (women) teams
Association football clubs established in 2008
Association football clubs disestablished in 2009
2008 establishments in the Netherlands
2009 disestablishments in the Netherlands
Football clubs in Kerkrade